Villa de María del Río Seco (usually shortened to Villa de María, not to be confused with Villa María) is a town in the province of Córdoba, Argentina.

Villa de María was founded in 1796 or 1797 by the Marquis Rafael de Sobremonte (then to be Viceroy of the Río de la Plata), with the name of Río Seco. Its name was changed to the current one by provincial governor Roque Ferreira on 26 May 1858.

The town was the birthplace of the poet Leopoldo Lugones (1874–1938), whose childhood house is today a museum and a National Historic Monument. The area was also the stage of the assassination of the caudillo of Entre Ríos Province Francisco Ramírez, in 1821.

Climate

References

External links
 
 Villa de María at Enjoy-Argentina.org.
 Villa de María del Río Seco at TurismoCordoba.com.ar.
 Weather Forecast
 location/geography

Populated places in Córdoba Province, Argentina